Granada Theater may refer to:

 Granada Theater (Emporia, Kansas)
 Granada Theater (Kansas City, Kansas)
 Granada Theater (Lawrence, Kansas) 
 Granada Theater (Dallas, Texas)
 Granada Theater (The Dalles, Oregon)
 Granada Theater (Wilmington, California)
 Granada Theater (Santa Barbara, California)

 Granada Theatre may refer to:
 Granada Theatre, original name of and now the smaller screen at the Liberty Theatre in Camas, Washington
 Granada Theatre, Clapham Junction, London and others
 Granada Theatre (Chicago)
 Granada Theatre (Sherbrooke), Quebec
 Granada Theatre (Racine, Wisconsin), designed by J. Mandor Matson
 Granada Theatres Ltd, former cinema company and forerunner of Granada plc

See also
 Granada Cinema (disambiguation), several cinemas owned by Granada Theatres Ltd